Stephen Arthur may refer to:

Sir Stephen John Arthur, 8th Baronet, of the Arthur baronets
Stephen Lynch fitz Arthur, Mayor of Galway 1546–1547

See also